Deran is the sixth studio album by Nigerien guitarist and singer Bombino. 

It was recorded in Casablanca at Studio HIBA, a recording studio owned by the king of Morocco. In May 2018, ahead of the album's release, the music blog, Noisey, called Bombino, "the World's Best Guitarist™." Then, on the day before Deran's release, Bombino was dubbed "the Sultan of Shred" by the New York Times, a nickname that was then adopted by several news outlets around the world. Deran was officially released on 18 May 2018, and was received with wide-spread acclaim for both its musicality and its embracement of culture and heritage. Jason Heller of NPR wrote that Bombino's performance on the album, "speaks and breathes across centuries." Deran was nominated in the category of Best World Music Album at the 61st Annual Grammy Awards. Bombino is the first Nigerien artist to be nominated for a Grammy award.

Track listing

References

2018 albums
Desert blues albums